The sixth season of the television comedy series The Middle began airing on September 24, 2014, on ABC in the United States. It is produced by Blackie and Blondie Productions and Warner Bros. Television with series creators DeAnn Heline and Eileen Heisler as executive producers.

The show features Frances "Frankie" Heck (Patricia Heaton), a working-class, Midwestern woman married to Mike Heck (Neil Flynn) who resides in the small fictional town of Orson, Indiana. They are the parents of three children, Axl (Charlie McDermott), Sue (Eden Sher), and Brick (Atticus Shaffer).

On May 8, 2014, ABC renewed The Middle for a sixth season. On October 23, 2014, ABC gave the season a full 24-episode order.

Cast

Main cast
 Patricia Heaton as Frankie Heck
 Neil Flynn as Mike Heck
 Charlie McDermott as Axl Heck
 Eden Sher as Sue Heck
 Atticus Shaffer as Brick Heck

Recurring
 Brock Ciarlelli as Brad Bottig, one of Sue's ex-boyfriends who is now just a close friend at school
 Alphonso McAuley as Hutch, Axl's football teammate and best friend at college
 John Gammon as Darrin, Axl's friend and Sue's ex-boyfriend and ex-fiancé. The two broke up in the episode "The Answer" due to Sue's unwillingness to marry Darrin.
 Casey Burke as Cindy Hornberger, Brick's classmate, with whom he is in the early stages of a relationship
 Gia Mantegna as Devin Levin, a relative of Frankie's hairdresser who gets set up with Axl. The two end up liking each other and begin dating

Guest cast
 Richard Kind as Dr. Niller, Sue's orthodontist.
 Jimmy Kimmel as himself, the only fan of Brick's podcast about different fonts.
 Jerry Hardin as Old Farmer, who attends Sue's pumpkin-patch film screening and donates $50 to her college fund.
 Phyllis Smith as Ms. Huff, Sue's guidance counselor.
 Kirstie Alley as Pam Staggs, the most popular girl in high school who wouldn't give Frankie a second look back then.
 Brian Doyle-Murray as Don Ehlert, the owner of the car dealership where Frankie used to work and must do so for one more day in order to cash an old paycheck.
 Jerry Van Dyke as Tag Spence, Frankie's father.
 Matthew Atkinson as Finn, Axl's friend.
 Dave Foley as Dr. Chuck Fulton, Brick's school therapist.
 Norm Macdonald as Rusty Heck, Mike's brother.
 Dick Van Dyke as Paul "Dutch" Spence, Frankie's uncle and Tag's older brother.
 Marsha Mason as Pat Spence, Frankie's mother.
 French Stewart as Principal Cameron

Critical reception 
Early reviews for the sixth season were positive. Will Harris of The A.V. Club stated that it was "not a bad way to start a new season". Robert Bianco of USA Today stated that "it's a strong start for an excellent, underappreciated series".

Episodes

Ratings

References

The Middle (TV series)
2014 American television seasons
2015 American television seasons